Rhiw may refer to:

 Rhiw, Conwy - an electoral ward in the county borough of Conwy, Wales, United Kingdom
 Rhiw, Gwynedd - a village in the county of Gwynedd, Wales, United Kingdom
 Rhiw, Powys - a place in the county of Powys, Wales, United Kingdom